Ciaotou Sugar Refinery is a station on the Red line of Kaohsiung MRT in Ciaotou District, Kaohsiung, Taiwan.

The station is a three-level, elevated station with one island platforms and three exits. It is 167 meters long and is located near the Taiwan Sugar dormitory.

Around the Station
 Taiwan Sugar Corporation Kaohsiung Factory
 Taiwan Railway Administration Western Line railways
 National Kaohsiung University of Science and Technology
 Ciaotou Old Streets
 Singtang Elementary School

References

External links
KRTC Ciaotou Sugar Refinery Station

2008 establishments in Taiwan
Kaohsiung Metro Red line stations
Railway stations opened in 2008